

The Thaden T-1 Argonaut was a 1920s American eight-seat all-metal cabin monoplane, built by the Thaden Metal Aircraft Company of San Francisco, California.

Description and history
The Thaden T-1 was a high-wing strut-braced monoplane, constructed of corrugated aluminum, and powered by a  Pratt & Whitney Wasp radial engine. It had a fixed conventional landing gear with a tailskid. Only one example was built (X3902); its first flight was on 15 January 1928, and its final flight ended in 1933 in a crash in Alaska. In 1986, the wrecked fuselage was recovered, and is now on display at the Hiller Aviation Museum in San Carlos, California.

Specifications

See also

Thaden T-2
Thaden T-4

References

Notes

Bibliography

1920s United States airliners
Economy of San Francisco
High-wing aircraft
Single-engined tractor aircraft
Aircraft first flown in 1928